Lord Walker may refer to:

Harold Walker, Baron Walker of Doncaster (1927–2003), British politician
Peter Walker, Baron Walker of Worcester (1932–2010), British politician
Robert Walker, Baron Walker of Gestingthorpe (born 1938), English barrister
Michael Walker, Baron Walker of Aldringham (born 1944), retired British Army officer